Ravenswood is a rural town and locality in the Charters Towers Region, Queensland, Australia.

It is historically and currently a gold mining town.

Geography
The Flinders Highway loosely bounds parts of the north-western boundary of the locality, entering from the north-east (Reid River) and exiting to the west (Broughton). The Great Northern railway line takes a similar route to the highway mostly immediately parallel to the highway to the north or the south, with the following stations:

 Cardington railway station, now abandoned
 Woldston railway station()
 Fanning railway station, now abandoned

There are a number of neighbourhoods within the locality:
 Boori
 Cardington
 Kirk
 Rochford
 Silver Valley
 Waigera
 Woldston

History 
After the discovery of gold in 1868 through to the early 1900s, the township flourished and grew to nearly 5000 residents and boasted 48 hotels. Several historic buildings remain from this period. Due to an industrial strike in 1912 and subsequently World War I, by 1915 mining declined and the town was deserted.

Silver was discovered in the area in 1870 by W. Stable.

Ravenswood State School opened on 27 October 1873.

From 1879 to 1930, Ravenswood was the administrative centre for local government, initially of Ravenswood Division (1879–1903) and later of the Shire of Ravenswood (1903–1930). However, with the decline in Ravenwood's population it was no longer financially viable to have a separate local government authority, and the Shire of Ravenswood was absorbed into the Shire of Dalrymple.

Ravenswood Convent School opened in 1885 in association with St Patrick's Catholic Church. It closed in 1948.

Sandy Creek Provisional School opened on 26 June 1885. In 1886 it was renamed Evlinton Provisional School. On 1 January 1909 it became Evlington State School. It closed in 1921.

Kirk River Provisional School opened on 1 October 1890. On 1 June 1929 it became Kirk River State School, but then closed on 8 May 1930. In 1934 it reopened as Kirk River Provisional School. It closed in 1944.

Kirk Diggings Provisional School opened on 1903 but closed and reopened a number of times before finally closing circa 1918.

Pandanus Creek Provisional School opened in 1909, becoming Pandanus Creek State School on 1 May 1909. It closed  in 1926.

In August 2017, an early cemetery in Ravenswood was found by contractors using ground penetrating radar while working on Carpentaria Gold's Ravenswood Expansion Project. The 16 graves of 9 adults and 7 children were found behind the Ravenswood State School sports oval; the burials are thought to have occurred in the late 1860s and early 1870s. Forensic archeologists will attempt to obtain DNA from the remains.

A major expansion to the local gold mining industry was announced in 2020.

Heritage listings 
Ravenswood has a number of heritage-listed sites, including:
 Mabel Mill, Barton Street
 Railway Hotel, Barton Street
 Ravenswood Community Church, Chapel Street
 Chapel Street Bridge, Chapel Street
 Ravenswood Ambulance Station, Deighton Street
 London North Mine, Elphinstone Street
 Cake Shop, Macrossan Street
 Imperial Hotel, Macrossan Street
 Ravenswood Post Office, Macrossan Street
 School of Arts, Macrossan Street
 Shop adjacent to Thorps Building, Macrossan Street
 Thorps Building, Macrossan Street
 Ravenswood Court House and Police Station, Raven Street
 Ravenswood School and Residence, School Street
 Totley Township, Totley (2 km from Ravenswood)
 Pandanus Creek Battery, via Ravenswood to Mingela Road
 Ravenswood Mining Landscape and Chinese Settlement Area, reserve bounded by School Street, Cemetery Road, Railway Street and Burdekin Falls Dam Road

Economy 
Two gold mines are in operation in the area; a large open cast pit behind the town and an underground one at nearby Mount Wright. With the resurgence of mining in recent years, the population has grown from 200  to nearly 500. Tourism is also important.

Education
Ravenswood State School is a government primary (Early Childhood-6) school for boys and girls at School Street. In 2018, the school had an enrolment of 23 students with 3 teachers (2 full-time equivalent) and 6 non-teaching staff (3 full-time equivalent).

There is no secondary school in Ravenswood. The nearest government secondary school is Charters Towers State High School in Charters Towers to the west.

Due to the extensive size of this locality, the distances involved to travel to either or both of these schools may make it impossible to attend. Distance education and boarding schools are the other options.

Amenities

Facilities in the town include a combined general store and post office, a primary school and two pubs, the Railway and the Imperial. Fuel can be obtained from both Top Camp near the entrance to the town and the post office. Top Camp also offers meals and bungalow style accommodation.

See also
 List of tramways in Queensland

References

External links 

 
 

 
Towns in Queensland
Charters Towers Region
Localities in Queensland
Mining towns in Queensland
North Queensland